The RydB RNA is a non-coding RNA  originally identified in E. coli in an RNA screen. This gene is only 67 nucleotides in length and is composed of a hairpin like structure.  RydB lies between the ydiC and ydiH in E. coli.  Homologous RNA genes have been found in other species such as Shigella flexneri and Salmonella  species.  The molecular function of this RNA is unknown.

See also 
RyhB RNA
RyeB RNA
RyeE RNA

References

External links 

 

Non-coding RNA